Charles Hunter (May 3, 1892 – November 21, 1974) was an American long-distance runner. He competed in the men's 5000 metres at the 1920 Summer Olympics.

References

External links
 

1892 births
1974 deaths
Athletes (track and field) at the 1920 Summer Olympics
American male long-distance runners
Olympic track and field athletes of the United States
Place of birth missing
20th-century American people